Roundup is an unincorporated community located in northeastern Hockley County. The town is located on the high plains of the Llano Estacado at the intersection of U.S. Route 84 and Farm to Market Road 2130 between Anton and Shallowater.

History
Roundup was established in 1912 and was originally located on the second Spade Ranch. The town was developed as a stop on the Santa Fe Railroad and shipped cattle, cotton, and grain for the ranch. The town's population peaked at 50 in 1948 then declined to 27 in 1980 and today the population is estimated to be around 20.

Education
The town is served by the Anton Independent School District.

See also
U.S. Route 84
BNSF Railway
Yellow House Draw
Blackwater Draw
Caprock Escarpment
Earth, Texas

References

External links

Unincorporated communities in Hockley County, Texas
Unincorporated communities in Texas